Professor Harold Richard Gamsu FRCP, FRCPCH (1931–2004) was a neonatologist.

Gamsu was born in Windhoek, Namibia, on 23 January 1931. His father, a Russian Jewish émigré, Barnet Isaac Gamsu, was a businessman.

He attended Windhoek High School, and then studied at the University of Witwatersrand, graduating in 1954.

He continued training in paediatrics at the University of Sheffield and Cleveland Metropolitan General Hospital.

In 1965 he obtained a position as Wates Fellow at King's College Hospital, and was Reader in Neonatal Paediatrics and Director of the Regional Neonatal Unit there from 1979, and Professor of Neonatology from 1994. Upon his retirement in 1995, he became Emeritus.

He served as honorary secretary of the British Association of Perinatal Medicine from 1980 to 1983.

He died on 31 August 2004.

References

External links 

 

1931 births
2004 deaths
Fellows of the Royal College of Physicians
Fellows of the Royal College of Paediatrics and Child Health
British neonatologists
People educated at Windhoek High School
University of the Witwatersrand alumni
Alumni of the University of Sheffield